Parunxia scopifera is a species of beetle in the family Cerambycidae, the only species in the genus Parunxia.

References

Unxiini
Monotypic beetle genera